Slalom printre cretini ("Drifting Among Morons") is the ninth studio album by Romanian rap group Paraziții. It was released on November 22, 2007.

Track list

References

Paraziții albums
2007 albums
Romanian-language albums